Paul Mannion (born 25 May 1993) is an Irish Gaelic footballer who plays for the Kilmacud Crokes club and, since 2013, at senior level for the Dublin county team.

He transferred to Donegal Boston in 2022.

Personal
He studied International Commerce and Chinese in UCD. As part of his studies he spent a year living in China studying Mandarin Chinese. His year spent living abroad meant that he was not part of Dublin's All-Ireland win in 2015.

Career statistics

Honours
 Leinster Minor Football Championship (1): 2011
 Leinster Under-21 Football Championship (2): 2012, 2014
 All-Ireland Under-21 Football Championship (2): 2012, 2014
 National Football League (4): 2013, 2014, 2016, 2018
 Leinster Senior Football Championship (6): 2013, 2014, 2016, 2017, 2018, 2019
 All-Ireland Senior Football Championship (6): 2013, 2016, 2017, 2018, 2019, 2020
 All Stars (3): 2017, 2018, 2019

References

1993 births
Living people
Donegal Boston Gaelic footballers
Dublin inter-county Gaelic footballers
Gaelic football forwards
Irish expatriates in China
Irish Protestants
Kilmacud Crokes Gaelic footballers
Sportspeople from Dublin (city)
Winners of five All-Ireland medals (Gaelic football)